Chutti may refer to:

Chutti TV, Indian television station
Chutti Chathan, 2010 Indian Tamil-language 3D film written and directed by Jijo